The 9th Guldbagge Awards ceremony, presented by the Swedish Film Institute, honored the best Swedish films of 1972 and 1973, and took place on 29 October 1973. Cries and Whispers directed by Ingmar Bergman was presented with the award for Best Film.

Awards
 Best Film: Cries and Whispers by Ingmar Bergman
 Best Director: Johan Bergenstråhle for Foreigners
 Best Actor: Gösta Ekman for The Man Who Quit Smoking
 Best Actress: Harriet Andersson for Cries and Whispers
 Special Achievement: Sven Nykvist for Cries and Whispers

References

External links
Official website
Guldbaggen on Facebook
Guldbaggen on Twitter
9th Guldbagge Awards at Internet Movie Database

1973 in Sweden
1973 film awards
Guldbagge Awards ceremonies
October 1973 events in Europe
1970s in Stockholm